The Animation Industry in South Africa encompasses traditional 2D animation, 3D animation and visual effects for feature films.

History 
In 1916, Harold M. Shaw first created his first animated film called An Artist's Dream, it tells a tale about a protagonist who is an artist whose drawings come to life. In 1927, the first animators David and Shlomo Frenkel, two brothers from Egypt were inspired by first Disney Studios' Mickey Mouse. Their first animated film was destroyed in a fire in Cairo, however their later works were saved and preserved in a museum.

Awards and festivals 
Awards and conventions for the South African animation industry include:

 The Durban International Film Festival for Best South African Feature Film
 South African Film and Television Awards for Best Animation
 Cape Town International Animation Festival
 Africa Movie Academy Award for Best Animation
 Anima Mundi for Best Children's Feature
 Gold Panda Award for Best Foreign Animation
 Zanzibar International Film Festival for best animation
 South African Film and Television Awards for Best music composition for a feature film
 Gold Panda Award for Grand Prize
 Annecy Animation Festival for Best Animation
 My Better World Award for Kids: Factual & Entertainment category [International Emmy Award] 
The Snail and the Whale for best special production [International Animated film Association]

Industry

South Africa's animation industry consists of 29 production companies with its major studios including Triggerfish Studios, Clockwork Zoo Animation and Sunrise Productions. South Africa's animation sector consists of private companies using animation techniques for advertising, websites, architecture, etc. South Africa's animation studios don't have the funding for traditional animation, their market was too small to make it viable. This market still has a skills deficit and little to no government funding.

Market 
Cape Town, Port Elizabeth, Plettenberg Bay, Johannesburg and Durban have several major animation studios in the country.
Department of Trade and Industry (DTI) values its animation sector at R464 million in the film industry and box office,
WESGRO values it in the international market at the cost of R365 million in a cinematic budget, Visit website.
The Media, Information and Communication Technologies Sector Education and Training Authority (MICT SETA) encourages skills for young animators to boost South Africa's Socio-economic sector, also the small companies. The largest producer and exporter of animation is the Western world. It produces and exports animation for an estimate of US$145.4 million per year, and South Africa can produce for US$13,0 million per year due to its straining economy and lack of resources.

List of South African animated films 
One of the first animated films released in 1916 was An Artist's Dream, many of its films being released in South Africa.

List of South African animated television series

See also

Animation industry

References

South African animation
Animation industry